Jasia is a given name. Notable people with the given name include:

Jasia Akhtar (born 1988), Indian cricketer 
Jasia Reichardt (born 1933), British art critic, curator, art gallery director, teacher, and writer

Feminine given names